Top Chef: Los Angeles is the second season of the American reality television series Top Chef. It was first filmed in Los Angeles, before concluding in Waikoloa Village, Hawaii. The season premiered on October 18, 2006 and ended on January 31, 2007. Padma Lakshmi replaced Katie Lee Joel as the host, with Tom Colicchio and Gail Simmons returning as judges. The winning recipe from each week's episode was featured on Bravo's Top Chef website and prepared by Season 1 contestant Lee Anne Wong in a web video called The Wong Way to Cook. Bravo cited negative viewer reaction to the Season 2 chefs' attitudes and overall behavior as the reason why no reunion episode was filmed. In the season finale, Ilan Hall was declared the winner over runner-up Marcel Vigneron. Sam Talbot was voted Fan Favorite.

Contestants
Fifteen chefs were selected to compete in Top Chef: Los Angeles. 

Marcel Vigneron and Elia Aboumrad returned to compete in Top Chef: All-Stars. Josie Smith-Malave returned for Top Chef: Seattle. Vigneron later competed in Top Chef Duels, and returned again for Top Chef: Colorado, competing in the Last Chance Kitchen. Sam Talbot returned for Top Chef: Charleston.

Contestant progress

: The chef(s) did not receive immunity for winning the Quickfire Challenge.
: Otto voluntarily withdrew before Lakshmi eliminated anyone, deciding that his misconduct over the unpaid lychees contributed the most to his team's loss.
: After allegations of cheating, the judges decided not to eliminate anyone. Consequently, two chefs were eliminated in the following episode.
: There were five winners in the Quickfire Challenge. These winners did not compete in the Elimination Challenge.
: Mia voluntarily withdrew before Lakshmi eliminated anyone, fearing Elia would be eliminated.
: Following the Elimination Challenge, no winning team was declared. The Bottom 3 was decided based on each chef's individual performance.
: Cliff was disqualified for aggressive physical contact with Marcel. No one else was eliminated going into the finale.
 (WINNER) The chef won the season and was crowned "Top Chef".
 (RUNNER-UP) The chef was a runner-up for the season.
 (WIN) The chef won the Elimination Challenge.
 (HIGH) The chef was selected as one of the top entries in the Elimination Challenge, but did not win.
 (IN) The chef was not selected as one of the top or bottom entries in the Elimination Challenge and was safe.
 (LOW) The chef was selected as one of the bottom entries in the Elimination Challenge, but was not eliminated.
 (OUT) The chef lost the Elimination Challenge.
 (WDR) The chef voluntarily withdrew from the competition.
 (DSQ) The chef was disqualified from the competition.

Episodes

References
Notes

Footnotes

External links
 Official website

Top Chef
2006 American television seasons
2007 American television seasons
Television shows set in Los Angeles
Television shows filmed in California
Television shows filmed in Hawaii